Shawn Ferguson (born January 21, 1991, in Rock Hill, South Carolina) is a retired American soccer player who formerly played for Charleston Battery in the United Soccer League.

Career
Born in Rock Hill, South Carolina, Ferguson started his career with Discoveries Soccer Club  and Northwestern High School, playing on both teams with future Battery teammate Ricky Garbanzo.  He attended the College of Charleston and played as a center back on the Cougars soccer team.

While still finishing his college degree, Ferguson signed with USL Professional Division club Charleston Battery on April 3, 2013. During the 2014 season Ferguson became a first-choice starter in central defense alongside Colin Falvey. Ferguson had a breakthrough season in 2015, starting 27 of 28 league matches and being voted the club's defender of year by fans as well as being named a First Team All-USL selection by the league.

Prior to the 2016 season, Ferguson was named team captain by coach Mike Anhaeuser.

Ferguson retired shortly before the 2017 season.

References

External links
 
 Charleston profile

1991 births
Living people
American soccer players
College of Charleston Cougars men's soccer players
Charleston Battery players
Soccer players from South Carolina
USL Championship players
Association football defenders
People from Rock Hill, South Carolina